The southern giant slender-tailed cloud rat or southern Luzon giant cloud rat  (Phloeomys cumingi), also known as bugkon in Filipino, is a vulnerable species of rodent in the family Muridae, found only in southern Luzon in the Philippines. It is dark brown, occasionally with some reddish, but lacking the light-coloured sections usually seen in its close relative, the northern Luzon giant cloud rat (P. pallidus).

Equally at home high amongst the branches of a tree as on the forest floor, the southern giant slender-tailed cloud rat is a slow-moving animal only active at night, spending the day in hollow trees or logs. It usually lives singly, or in pairs consisting of an adult male and female, or a female and her young, but larger groups have also been seen. Their diet consists primarily of tender, young leaves, but fruit is also reportedly eaten. The southern giant slender-tailed cloud rat typically gives birth to a single pup each year, with data indicating that most births take place during the late rainy season. The young are born in the hollow of a standing or fallen tree, or in a hole in the ground. The mother carries her young firmly attached to a nipple. In captivity, one cloud rat lived for over 13 years.

References

External links 
 Phloeomys cumingi at ITIS
 Phloeomys cumingi at gbif

Rats of Asia
Phloeomys
Endemic fauna of the Philippines
Rodents of the Philippines
Fauna of Luzon
Fauna of Catanduanes
Fauna of Marinduque
Mammals described in 1839
Taxonomy articles created by Polbot